The Great Jowett was a BBC radio play written by Graham Greene. First broadcast on Saturday 6 May 1939, it was produced and narrated by Stephen Potter. The play chronicles the life of an Oxford don, Benjamin Jowett during the 19th century and his struggles to be a Master for a college whilst translating Plato.

Characters
 Commentator
 Mr Griggs - Oxford Guide
 Mr Foster - head porter of Balliol
 Benjamin Jowett
 Matthew Knight - his servant
 Arthur Stanley
 Green, Peel, Ross and Smith - fellows of Balliol
 The Vice Chancellor
 Paine and Plumer - Undergraduates
 Algernon Swinburne
 Dr Scott - Master of Balliol
 Mrs Sparks - a Landlady
 Archbishop of Canterbury
 Matthew Arnold
 Miss Knight - Jowett's housekeeper

References

1939 plays
British radio dramas
Plays by Graham Greene